Ben Fitchet (born 8 November 1992) is a Guernsey cricketer. He was named in Guernsey's squad for the 2017 ICC World Cricket League Division Five tournament in South Africa. He played in Guernsey's opening fixture, against Italy, on 3 September 2017.

References

External links
 

1992 births
Living people
Guernsey cricketers
Place of birth missing (living people)